Flink (full name: The Misadventures of Flink according to the title screen) is a 2D scrolling platform video game developed by former members of Thalion and published by Psygnosis.

The Amiga CD32 and Mega CD versions are reliant on CD-ROM media to store large levels, highly detailed graphics, and high-quality music. Except for the CD soundtrack, the Mega Drive and Mega CD versions are identical. All versions were published in Europe by Psygnosis, but only the Mega CD version was released in the United States, published by Vic Tokai.

Flink is one of the few Amiga CD32 titles not to see a release for the Amiga home computer on which the CD32's hardware is based.

The creators, Erwin Kloibhofer, Henk Nieborg, and Matthias Steinwachs, had previously worked on the Thalion game Lionheart for the Amiga 500. In 1996, Kloibhofer and Nieborg collaborated one last time on The Adventures of Lomax for the PlayStation and Microsoft Windows.

Reception
Reviewing the Mega CD version, GamePro assessed that the quality of the gameplay, graphics, and sound are solid, but that the style is unbearably cutesy, enjoyable only "for an audience that thinks Mickey Mouse is too grown up." Next Generation, while deriding the game for using the same platforming basics as the by-then ten-year-old Super Mario Bros., acknowledged that the mechanics for casting spells was an original touch, and praised the overall strong challenge. They gave it three out of five stars, concluding, "Flink comes perilously close to being so average it makes your brain begin to bleed, but the game still comes up with enough inventive touches, details, and sharp, colorful graphics so that, in the final outcome, the positives outweigh the negatives." Diehard GameFan's reviewers were extremely positive, giving it near-perfect scores and calling it "simply put the best Sega CD action game that I have ever played."

References

External links

1994 video games
Amiga games
Amiga 1200 games
Amiga CD32 games
Psygnosis games
Sega CD games
Sega Genesis games
Vic Tokai games
Epic/Sony Records games
Side-scrolling platform games
Fantasy video games
Single-player video games
Video games developed in the United Kingdom